Pitfall: The Lost Expedition is a pair of action-adventure video games, one for the Game Boy Advance, and the other for the GameCube, PlayStation 2, Xbox, and Windows. It is the sixth installment of the Pitfall series. It was released by Activision on February 18, 2004 in North America and February 20, 2004 in the PAL region. The PC version was released on October 15, 2004 only in North America. The game was also released on September 23, 2008 on the Wii as Pitfall: The Big Adventure. Pitfall: The Big Adventure was released under the brand Fun4All in Europe.  It was followed in 2012 by Pitfall! for mobile devices.

Plot 
In 1935,  Pitfall Harry, the fearless, rough-and-ready treasure hunter from the Pitfall! series, returns to help a beautiful archaeologist rescue her father and thwart the evil Jonathan St. Claire from claiming the lost city of El Dorado. As Harry, players encounter various animal enemies, including scorpions, bats, piranhas, crocodiles and penguins, as well as human adversaries under the leadership of the sinister St. Claire. Numerous abilities are at the player's disposal as Harry recovers pages of the Heroic Handbook. With his various items, Harry is equipped for almost anything. Harry will also find lost explorers and be rewarded with golden idols for his trouble, which he can then use as currency with the Shaman.

Mobile 

Also released at this time were three mobile versions of the game: Pitfall: The Lost Expedition Caves, Pitfall: The Lost Expedition Glacier, and Pitfall: The Lost Expedition Jungle.

Reception 

Pitfall: The Lost Expedition received mixed to positive reviews from critics, while The Big Adventure received mixed to negative reviews, according to the review aggregation website Metacritic.

References

External links 
 Pitfall Harry official website
 
 

2004 video games
3D platform games
Action-adventure games
Activision games
Aspyr games
Beenox games
Game Boy Advance games
GameCube games
Multiplayer and single-player video games
Lost Expedition
PlayStation 2 games
Video games developed in Australia
Video games developed in Canada
Video games scored by Kevin Manthei
Video games using Havok
Wii games
Windows games
Xbox games
Torus Games games
Video games developed in the United States